The 2013–14 CERH European League was the 49th season of Europe's premier club roller hockey competition organised by CERH, and the 17th season since it was renamed from Champions League to European League. Sixteen teams from six national associations qualified for the competition as a result of their domestic league placing in the previous season. Following a group stage and a knockout round, the four best teams contested a final four tournament, which took place at the Palau Blaugrana in Barcelona, on 3 and 4 May 2014.

The final match was played between Barcelona and Porto, for the sixth time in the competition's history, after they defeated the defending champions Benfica and the 2012–13 CERS Cup winners Vendrell in the semi-finals, respectively. Barcelona beat Porto 3–1 and won their twentieth title, establishing a new record. The Portuguese team lost their second consecutive final and finished the competition as runners-up for a record tenth time.

Barcelona will play against Noia, the winners of the 2013–14 CERS Cup, for the 2014 CERH Continental Cup, and against the winners of the 2014 South American Club Championship for the 2014 FIRS Intercontinental Cup.

Teams
Sixteen teams from six national associations qualified for the 2013–14 CERH European League as a result of their placing in their respective national leagues. The number of berths allocated to each national association was dependent on the association's ranking coefficient.

Group stage

Group A

Group B

Group C

Group D

Quarter-finals
In the quarter-finals, the group stage winners played against the group stage runners-up over two legs, in a home-and-away basis. The first leg matches were played on 29 March and the second leg matches were played on 12 April 2014.

|}

Final four
The quarter-final winners contested a final four tournament, held at the Palau Blaugrana in Barcelona. The semi-finals were played on 3 May and the final was played on 4 May 2014.

Semi-finals

Final

See also
2013–14 CERS Cup
2013–14 CERH Women's European League

References

External links
 CERH website
  Roller Hockey links worldwide
  Mundook-World Roller Hockey

Rink Hockey Euroleague
2013 in roller hockey
CERH European League